Yordan Tomov (8 January 1924 – 10 March 1998) was a Bulgarian footballer and coach. He usually played the position of left winger.

Honours

Club
Levski Sofia
 Republic Championship (1): 1947
 A Group (3): 1948–49, 1950, 1953
 Bulgarian Cup (3): 1947, 1949, 1950

References

External links
 Player Profile at LevskiSofia.info

1924 births
1998 deaths
Bulgarian footballers
Bulgaria international footballers
Bulgarian football managers
FC Septemvri Sofia players
PFC Levski Sofia players
First Professional Football League (Bulgaria) players
Footballers from Sofia

Association football forwards